In the 1994–95 season Cagliari Calcio is competing in Serie A and Coppa Italia.

Squad 

(captain)

Transfers

In
Roberto Muzzi from AS Roma (November)
Daniele Berretta from AS Roma (loan)
Andrea Benassi from Massese
Antonio Bitetti from Matera
Christian Lantignotti from A.C. Reggiana 1919
Luigi Molino from Olbia

Out
Dario Marcolin to Genoa
Antonio Aloisi to Cesena
Francesco Moriero to AS Roma

Competitions

Serie A

League table

Results by round

Matches

Coppa Italia

Eightfinals

Statistics

Squad statistics

External links 
 
 http://www.calcio.com/tutte_le_partite/ita-serie-a-1994-1995/

References

Cagliari